Kim Yoo-yeon (also Kim Yu-yeon, ; born March 30, 1982 in Seoul) is a South Korean sport shooter. Kim represented South Korea at the 2008 Summer Olympics in Beijing. where she competed in the women's 50 m rifle 3 positions. She was able to shoot 193 targets in a prone position, 181 in standing, and 195 in kneeling, for a total score of 569 points, finishing only in thirty-fourth place.

References

External links
NBC 2008 Olympics profile

South Korean female sport shooters
Living people
Olympic shooters of South Korea
Shooters at the 2008 Summer Olympics
Sport shooters from Seoul
1982 births